The National Institute of Animal Biotechnology  is an Indian autonomous research establishment of the Department of Biotechnology, Ministry of Science and Technology (India). The NIAB is set up in Hyderabad, India, under the leadership of Prof. Pallu Reddanna. "The state of the art of Animal Biotechnology and Transgenics institute" is housed in the NIAB Campus in Gachibowli.

The primary mandate of NIAB is towards the development of sustainability and globally competitive livestock (farm animals) for public and industry through innovative and cutting edge technology. There will emphasis on showing excellence in production of globally competitive livestock products, pharmaceuticals (medicines), nutritional products and other biologicals related to animal health care.

Academics and research
The main focus of NIAB will be to nurture the bio-entrepreneurship in the animal biotechnology field and to perform hard core translational research involving livestock and beneficial to mankind. There will be research laboratories of various disciplines e.g. Genomics, Nutrition enrichment, transgenic technology, infectious diseases and Reproductive biotechnology.
NIAB will conduct teaching and research programs of M.Sc. and Ph.D. to train young scientists.  Dr. G. Taru Sharma took charge as new director since 7 December 2021.

See also
Genome Valley
Education in India
Literacy in India
List of institutions of higher education in Telangana

References

External links
Official Website NIAB

Research institutes in Hyderabad, India
Multidisciplinary research institutes
Science education in India
Biotechnology in India
Research institutes established in 2010
2010 establishments in Andhra Pradesh
Animal research institutes